New Hope-Solebury High School is a public high school located at 182 West Bridge Street in New Hope, Pennsylvania. The school's mascot is the Lion, and its colors are royal blue and gold. It is located in the New Hope-Solebury School District. The school houses grades 9 through 12, and largely receives students from New Hope-Solebury Middle School. The school has approximately 500 students. They are currently ranked tenth in the state of Pennsylvania by the U.S. News & World Report. Patrick Sasse is the current principal of New Hope-Solebury High School.

Student body

As of 2021-2022:

Academics
New Hope-Solebury High School is divided into departments for mathematics, science, social studies/history, foreign languages, English, fine arts, business education, gifted students, health and physical education, information technology, and practical arts technology. AP Courses are offered in at least nineteen subjects: Biology, Calculus BC, Chemistry, Computer Science, English Language & Composition, English Literature, Environmental Science, European History, French, Macroeconomics, Microeconomics, Music Theory, Physics, Psychology, Spanish, Statistics, Studio Art, U.S. Government  Politics, and U.S. History. The school offers additional APs online.

For the 2019-2020 school year, the average SAT score for New Hope-Solebury students was 634 for reading and 653 for math. The average ACT score for the 2019-2020 school year was 30. New Hope-Solebury High School weighs Honors and AP classes above their unweighted 4.0 scale. The 50th percentile GPA for the graduating class of 2019 was 3.726.

New Hope-Solebury High School was rated the second-best high school in Pennsylvania by U.S. News & World Report in 2015 and 2016. In 2022, they were ranked the tenth-best high school in Pennsylvania.

Students also may take courses at Middle Bucks Institute of Technology, offering them more vocational based educations. There also is a senior program that allows students to learn either anatomy or engineering at MBIT, under the direction of a Penn State University professor, and earn college credits through Penn State University.

Performing arts
New Hope-Solebury High School offers a performing arts program through the Mask & Zany Theatre Club and the school's choir, band, and orchestra. The Stephen J. Buck auditorium houses roughly 500 people and is used for the Mask & Zany theater productions; band, choir, and orchestra concerts; assemblies, community town halls, club meetings, and class meetings.

The New Hope-Solebury band program gives concerts several times every year. The group has participated in competitions in Disney World, Toronto, and Chicago. The band program offers both a concert band and the more selective jazz band.

The choir is made up of students from grades 9-12. While the choir is open to all students who are interested in participating, students must audition to be accepted into the chamber choir. Both choirs perform at concerts and competitions in various locations.

The New Hope Solebury orchestra, which consists of the bass, cello, viola and violin, plays a variety of music, from classical to modern Broadway. The orchestra is split into the concert orchestra and chamber orchestra. They have played alongside the band and choir in San Francisco, Toronto, Hersheypark, Chicago, Nashville, London, Paris, Philadelphia, Disney World, Disney Land, Dorney Park & Wildwater Kingdom, and more. At several of these locations, they played in competitions, and their performances resulted in several awards. In 2012, the orchestra played at the White House in Washington, D.C. In 2018, the orchestra played at Carnegie Hall in New York City. In 2019, they played in Italy at several locations. In December 2021, the orchestra, along with the band and choir, traveled to Hawaii to participate in the D-Day Memorial Parade.

Activities
                                                                    
The school offers a number of student clubs and extracurricular activities.

New Hope-Solebury High school is a part of the PIAA (Pennsylvania Interscholastic Athletic Association) and part of the Bicentennial Athletic League. NHS competes in cross country, golf, field hockey, volleyball, soccer, basketball, wrestling, baseball, football, softball, lacrosse, tennis, and track. The school has many clubs, including a yearbook club and a debate club. The girls' soccer team has gone to the PIAA state quarterfinal, and the boys' soccer team made it to the PIAA State Finals in 2006. In 2010, the boys' soccer team won the PIAA State Finals, after beating the Mercyhurst Prep team with a score of 2-1. In 2011, the boys' soccer team won the PIAA State Finals again, beating Mercyhurst Prep 3-2. The boys' soccer team came 2nd in the PIAA State Finals in 2006 and 2019. The boys' golf team won the state golf finals in 2014 and came 2nd in the state finals in 2015. The boys' baseball team made it the PIAA state final tournament in 2010.

References

External links
 Official site

Public high schools in Pennsylvania
Schools in Bucks County, Pennsylvania